The States of South Sudan were created out of the three historic former provinces (and contemporary regions) of Bahr el Ghazal (northwest), Equatoria (southern), and Greater Upper Nile (northeast). The states are further divided into 79 counties.

In October 2015, South Sudan's President Salva Kiir Mayardit issued a decree establishing 28 states in place of the 10 that was  previously established. The decree established the new states largely along ethnic lines. A number of opposition parties challenged the constitutionality of this decree and the decree was referred to parliament for approval as a constitutional amendment. In November, the South Sudanese parliament approved the creation of the new states. In January 2017, President Salva Kiir stated a decreed of further subdivision of the country from 28 into 32 states.

In February 2020, as a result of a peace agreement that ended the South Sudanese Civil War, the country returned to the original 10 states plus two administrative areas, Pibor and Ruweng, and the special administrative status area of Abyei.

As a result of the Comprehensive Peace Agreement signed in 2005, the Abyei Area is considered to be simultaneously part of the Republic of Sudan and the Republic of South Sudan, effectively a condominium. The Kafia Kingi area is disputed between South Sudan and Sudan and the Ilemi Triangle is disputed between South Sudan and Kenya.

Ten states and three areas (2020–present) 

Under the terms of a peace agreement signed on 22 February 2020, South Sudan is divided into ten states, two administrative areas and one area with special administrative status. The states and administrative areas are grouped into the three former historical provinces of the Sudan: Bahr el Ghazal, Equatoria, Greater Upper Nile.  Each state is headed by a Governor and administrative areas are led by Chief Administrators.

32 states (2017–2020)

On 14 January 2017, President Kiir issued a presidential decree that increased the number of federal states from 28 to 32.

 The now defunct Eastern Nile State was split into 2 individual states, Central Upper Nile State with Malakal as its capital city and Northern Upper Nile State with Renk as its capital city.
 Akobo State was formed and split from Bieh State, with Akobo as its capital. It comprises Akobo county in the Greater Upper Nile Region.
 Maiwut State was formed and split from Latjoor State in the Greater Upper Nile Region retaining Koma, Longuchuk, and Maiwut counties.
 Tambura State was formed and split from Gbudwe State, with Tambura as its capital. It comprises Tambura and Nagero counties in the Equatoria Region.

List
The 32 states were as follows:

Note:

* - includes Bari, Lokoya and Nyangwara communities

28 states (2015–2017)

Bahr el Ghazal
 Aweil
 Aweil East
 Eastern Lakes
 Gogrial
 Gok
 Lol
 Tonj
 Twic
 Wau
 Western Lakes

Equatoria
 Amadi
 Gbudwe
 Imatong
 Jubek1
 Maridi
 Namorunyang
 Terekeka
 Yei River

Greater Upper Nile
 Boma
 Bieh2
 Eastern Nile
 Jonglei
 Latjoor
 Northern Liech
 Ruweng
 Southern Liech
 Fangak3
 Fashoda4

 – containing the national capital city of Juba
 – earlier called Eastern Bieh
 – earlier called Western Bieh
 – earlier called Western Nile

10 states (2011–2015)

SPLM-IO declaration 

On 22 December 2014, opposition leader and former vice president Riek Machar declared the 10 states of South Sudan dissolved and the formation of 21 new states in a federal system. The declaration was not recognised by the South Sudanese government. The Sudan Tribune reported on 1 January 2015 that Machar appointed "military governors" for several of his declared states. These states became defunct when the SPLM-IO joined the unity government formed by the R-ARCSS in February 2020.

See also 

List of states of South Sudan by Human Development Index
List of current state governors in South Sudan
 ISO 3166-2:SS
 States of Sudan

References

External links 

 South Sudan States Map

 
 States
South Sudan, States
South Sudan 1
States, South Sudan
South Sudan geography-related lists